Chang Wanquan (born January 1949) is the former Minister of Defense and State Councilor of the People's Republic of China and a general in the People's Liberation Army. He has been a member of the Central Military Commission of the People's Republic of China and helped to manage China's space program.

Life and career 
Born in Nanyang, Henan Province, in 1949, Chang joined the PLA in March 1968 and the Chinese Communist Party (CCP) in November of the same year. From January 2002 to December 2004, he was the chief of staff and a CCP committee member of the Lanzhou Military Region. From December 2004 to September 2007, he was the commander of the Shenyang Military Region. He was also director of the PLA General Armaments Department. In October 2007 he was elected as a member of the Central Military Commission.

He attained the rank of senior colonel in 1992, major general in July 1997, lieutenant general in 2003, and full general in October 2007. He has been a member of the 16th, 17th and  18th Central Committees.

In October 2012, he was appointed Minister of National Defense, succeeding General Liang Guanglie.

At the first plenary session of the 12th National People's Congress, he was also appointed as State Councilor.

References 

1949 births
Living people
People's Liberation Army generals from Henan
People from Nanyang, Henan
Ministers of National Defense of the People's Republic of China
State councillors of China